Solomon Bell (born 27 February 2001) is an English cricketer. He made his first-class debut on 23 September 2019, for Durham in the 2019 County Championship.

References

External links
 

2001 births
Living people
English cricketers
Durham cricketers
Place of birth missing (living people)
English cricketers of the 21st century